Pachyrhynchini is a true weevil tribe in the subfamily Entiminae.

Genera 
 Apocyrtidius Heller, 1908 (Type species: Apocyrtidius chlorophanus Heller, 1908)
 Apocyrtus  Erichson, 1834 (Type species: Apocyrtus inflatus Ercihson, 1834)
 Enoplocyrtus Yoshitake, 2017 (Type species: Enoplocyrtus marusan Yoshitake, 2017)
 Eumacrocyrtus Schultze, 1923 (Type species: Eumacrocyrtus canlaonensis Schultze, 1923)
 Eupachyrrhynchus Heller, 1912 (Type species: Eupachyrrhynchus superbus Heller, 1912)
 Exnothapocyrtus Schultze, 1924 (Type species: Nothapocyrtus cylindricollis Heller, 1912)
 Expachyrhynchus Yoshitake, 2013 (Type species: Expachyrhynchus chloromaculatus Yoshitake, 2013)
 Homalocyrtus Heller, 1912 (Type species: not designated)
 Macrocyrtus Heller, 1912 (Type species: Apocyrtus nigrans Pascoe, 1881)
 Subgenus Exmacrocyrtus Schultze, 1924 (Type species: Macrocyrtus erosus (Pascoe, 1873))
 Metapocyrtus Heller, 1912 (Type species: Apocyrtus rugicollis Chevrolat, 1881)
 Subgenus Artapocyrtus Heller, 1912 (Type species: Apocyrtus bifasciatus Waterhouse, 1842)
 Subgenus Dolichocephalocyrtus Schultze, 1925 (Type species: Metapocyrtus dolosus Heller, 1913)
 Subgenus Orthocyrtus Heller, 1912 (Type species: Metapocyrtus triangularis Heller, 1913)
 Subgenus Sclerocyrtus Heller, 1912 (Type species: Metapocyrtus asper Heller, 1913)
 Subgenus Sphenomorphoidea Heller, 1912 (Type species: Apocyrtus metallicus Waterhouse, 1842)
 Subgenus Trachycyrtus Heller, 1912 (Type species: Apocyrtus profanus Ercihson, 1834)
 Nothapocyrtus Heller, 1912 (Type species: Nothapocyrtus translucidus Heller, 1912)
 Pachyrhynchus Germer, 1824 (Type species: Pachyrhynchus moniliferus Germer, 1824)
 Pantorhytes Faust, 1892 (Type species: Pachyrhynchus chrysomelas Montrouzier, 1855)
 Proapocyrtus Schultze, 1918 (Type species: Proapocyrtus insularis Schultze, 1918)
 Pseudapocyrtus Heller, 1912 (Type species: Pseudoapocyrtus imitator Heller, 1912)
 Schauenbergia Osella, 1977 (Type species: Schauenbergia anophthalma Osella, 1977)
 Sphenomorpha Behrens, 1887 (Type species: not designated)
 Trichomacrocyrtus Yoshitake, 2018 (Type species: Eupachyrrhynchus hieroglyphicus Scultze, 1917)

References 

 Schönherr, C.J. 1826: Curculionidum dispositio methodica cum generum characteribus, descriptionibus atque observationibus variis seu Prodromus ad Synonymiae Insectorum, partem IV. Fleischer, Lipsiae: X + 338
 Alonso-Zarazaga, M.A.; Lyal, C.H.C. 1999: A world catalogue of families and genera of Curculionoidea (Insecta: Coleoptera) (excepting Scolytidae and Platypodidae). Entomopraxis, Barcelona 
 Yap, S. 2008: Checklist of the Metapocyrtus complex (Curculionidae: Entiminae: Pachyrrhynchini) of the Philippines. Asia life sciences, 17 (2): 240-260

External links 

Entiminae